Events from the year 1655 in Ireland.

Incumbent
Lord Protector: Oliver Cromwell

Events
July – Henry Cromwell, son of Oliver, is appointed as major-general of the forces in Ireland and a member of the Irish council of state. After the Lord Deputy, Charles Fleetwood, departs for England in September, Henry Cromwell de facto takes over that role also.

Births
Approximate date
Sir Nicholas Acheson, 4th Baronet, politician (d.1701)
Henry Luttrell, soldier (d.1717) (killed)
Daniel Roseingrave, organist (d.1727)

Deaths
February 16 – Rory (Roger) O'Moore, principal organizer of the Irish Rebellion of 1641 (b. c.1620)
June 16 – James Hamilton, 3rd Baron Hamilton of Strabane, peer (b.1633)

References

 
1650s in Ireland
Ireland
Years of the 17th century in Ireland